Bryan Smith (born November 29, 1983) is a former American football linebacker. He was drafted by the Philadelphia Eagles in the third round of the 2008 NFL Draft. He played college football at McNeese State.

Smith was also a member of the St. Louis Rams and Jacksonville Jaguars.

Early years
Smith was an All-district performer in both football and basketball and one of the top football players coming out of SE Texas in 2002. He earned four letters in both football and basketball and a high jumper in track and field and was third place in state high jump meet.

College career
As a senior in 2007, Smith recorded 10.5 sacks and 22.5 tackles for a loss  en route to his second consecutive little All-America nomination. In 2006, he was named SLC Defensive Player of the Year and was finalist for national Buck Buchanan award. He was also All-Louisiana and named to several First-team small college All-America squads. He had 13.5 sacks and 84 tackles, led SLC in tackles for a loss with 23 and recovered four fumbles and forced three. In 2005, he led the team with 11 tackles for loss, 11 quarterback hurries, and seven sacks. Smith had 43 total tackles in the season.

Professional career

Pre-draft measurables

Philadelphia Eagles
Smith was drafted by the Philadelphia Eagles in the third round of the 2008 NFL Draft. He signed a 4-year contract with the team on July 1, 2008. He was waived on September 5, 2009.

St. Louis Rams
The St. Louis Rams signed Smith to their practice squad on September 7, 2009.

Jacksonville Jaguars
Smith was signed off the St. Louis Rams' practice squad by the Jacksonville Jaguars on September 28, 2009. He was waived and subsequently placed on the injured reserve list on May 10, 2010.

References

External links
Jacksonville Jaguars bio
Philadelphia Eagles bio
McNeese State Cowboys bio

1983 births
Living people
People from Newton, Texas
Players of American football from Texas
American football defensive ends
American football linebackers
McNeese Cowboys football players
Philadelphia Eagles players
St. Louis Rams players
Jacksonville Jaguars players